This is a list of elections in Canada scheduled to be held in 2017. Included are provincial, municipal and federal elections, by-elections on any level, referendums and party leadership races at any level.

January to February
January 7: North Cedar, British Columbia Improvement District by-election.
January 14: Radium Hot Springs, British Columbia municipal by-election.
January 18: Naicam, Saskatchewan council by-election
January 21: 
School District 92 Nisga'a, British Columbia by-election.
School District 27 Cariboo-Chilcotin, British Columbia by-election. 
January 28: Mackenzie, British Columbia municipal by-election. 
February 5: Coaticook, Quebec District 1 municipal by-election.
February 11: Salt Spring Island, British Columbia Fire Protection District trustee by-election.
February 13: 
Ward 42 by-election, Toronto City Council
Yukon Francophone School Board trustee by-election
February 25: Warfield, British Columbia municipal by-election.
February 27: 
Drayton Valley, Alberta municipal by-election.
Taku River Tlingit First Nation clan director by-election.

March to April
March 2: 
Lax Kw'alaams Indian Band trustee by-election
Saskatoon Meewasin provincial by-election.
Nee-Tahi-Buhn Band councillor by-election.
March 3: Wet'suwet'en First Nation: Broman Lake councillor by-election.
March 4: 
Wells, British Columbia municipal by-election.
McBride, British Columbia municipal by-election.
March 9&12: Roseau River Anishinabe First Nation, Manitoba band council election and re-vote
March 14: 2017 Bloc Québécois leadership election
March 18: 
2017 Progressive Conservative Association of Alberta leadership election
Municipality of the District of St. Mary's, Nova Scotia District 3/5 special election.
March 24: Peguis First Nation, Manitoba chief and council election.
March 25: 
Port Clements, British Columbia mayoral and municipal by-elections.
School District 27 Cariboo-Chilcotin, British Columbia trustee by-election. 
Tsawwassen First Nation legislative by-election.
March 27: Georgina, Ontario Ward 1 municipal by-election
March 31: Lake Cowichan First Nation land code ratification vote.
April 3: Federal by-elections in Ottawa—Vanier, Markham—Thornhill, Saint-Laurent, Calgary Heritage and Calgary Midnapore.
April 6: Hupacasath First Nation general election.
April 10: Iqaluit, Nunavut municipal by-election.
April 12: 
Chinook School Division school board trustee by-election.
Halalt First Nation general election.
April 21: Sq'ewlets First Nation chief and council general election.
April 22: 
School District 74 Gold Trail, British Columbia trustee by-election.
Lower Nicola Indian Band by-election
April 27: Frog Lake First Nation general election.
April 29: School District 19 Revelstoke, British Columbia trustee by-election.

May to June
May 1: Stratford, Prince Edward Island Stewart Cove Ward by-election.
May 4: Seabird Island First Nation: Business plan and land use plane referendum.
May 8: Gitwangak Indian Band: Chief and council general election.
May 9: 2017 British Columbia general election
May 10: Horizon School Division, Saskatchewan trustee by-election.
May 12: Skin Tyee First Nation: Council by-election.
May 15: 
Kingston, Ontario District 1 municipal by-election
Municipal by-elections in Kedgwick, Le Goulet, Maisonnette, Shippagan, Salisbury and Saint-André, New Brunswick
Municipal election in Haut-Madawaska, New Brunswick
Plebiscites in the Local Service Districts of Cap-Bateau, Coteau Road, Haut-Lamèque, Miscou Island, Ste. Cecile, Petite-Lamèque, Pigeon Hill, Pointe-Alexandre, Pointe-Canot and Parish of Shippegan, New Brunswick
May 27: 
2017 Conservative Party of Canada leadership election
Métis Nation—Saskatchewan general election
May 29: Provincial by-election in Gouin, Quebec. 
May 30: 2017 Nova Scotia general election
June 1: Provincial by-election in Sault Ste. Marie, Ontario
June 2: McLeod Lake Band: Chief and council general election
June 4: 2017 Alberta Liberal Party leadership election
June 5: Rideau Lakes, Ontario municipal by-election in Bastard & South Burgess Ward. (Election had been planned for July, but was filled by acclamation on June 5.)
June 8: Aamjiwnaang First Nation by-elections.
June 10: Creston, British Columbia municipal by-election
June 13: Provincial by-election in Point Douglas, Manitoba
June 20: Ka:'yu:'k't'h'/Che:k:tlesʔet'h' legislative by-election.
June 24: 
Lake Country, British Columbia municipal by-elections
Temagami First Nation Land Code Ratification Vote

July to August
July 5: Tsawout First Nation: General election
July 7: 
Gwa'sala-'Nakwaxda'xw Nations: Chief and council general election
Gitsegukla Indian Band: General election.
July 8: Nanaimo, British Columbia municipal by-election.
July 19: 
Rural Municipality of Ritchot, Manitoba: Mayoral and council by-elections
Municipality of Swan River, Manitoba reeve by-election
July 20: Kispiox Band Council: Chief and council general election.
July 25: Enoch Cree Nation: Chief and council general election
July 29: Lunenburg, Nova Scotia special election
July 2 to August 2: Long Plain First Nation: Community Ratification Vote - Land Code
August 11: Tobacco Indian Band council by-election
August 19: planned Central Coast Regional District Electoral Area B by-election. Election cancelled as no valid nomination received.
August 30: Rural Municipality of South Qu'Appelle No. 157, Saskatchewan Division 2 council by-election.

September
September 7: 
Saskatoon Fairview provincial by-election
We Wai Kai Nation council by-election
September 9: Fort St. John, British Columbia council by-election
September 16: 
2017 Manitoba New Democratic Party leadership election
Wells, British Columbia municipal by-election.
September 19: Lynn Lake, Manitoba by-election.
September 20: Nipawin, Saskatchewan council by-election
September 23: Saanich, British Columbia council by-election
September 26: 2017 Newfoundland and Labrador municipal elections
September 30: 
Kamloops, British Columbia mayoral by-election.
Port Moody, British Columbia council by-election. 
Cowichan Valley Regional District Area B (Shawnigan Lake) by-election

October
October 1: 2017 New Democratic Party leadership election
October 2: Louis-Hébert provincial by-election. 
October 14: 
Vancouver City Council and Vancouver School Board by-elections
Municipality of Chester, Nova Scotia District 1 council by-election
October 16: 2017 Alberta municipal elections
October 17: Come By Chance, Newfoundland and Labrador by-election
October 18: Eston, Saskatchewan council by-election
October 20: 2017 Progressive Conservative Party of Prince Edward Island leadership election
October 21: 
2017 Manitoba Liberal Party leadership election
Cranbrook, British Columbia council by-election
Lions Bay, British Columbia council by-election
Municipality of Colchester, Nova Scotia District 9 council by-election
October 23: 
Essex, Ontario Ward 3 by-election
Federal by-elections in Sturgeon River—Parkland and Lac-Saint-Jean
Municipal by-elections in Grande-Anse (mayor), McAdam, Nigadoo, Petit Rocher, Rexton and Saint-André (mayor), New Brunswick.
Municipal plebiscite in the local service districts of Keswick Ridge, Douglas, Bright, and portions Kingsclear and Queensbury, New Brunswick to form a new rural municipality.
October 25: Osler, Saskatchewan municipal by-election 
October 27: 2017 New Brunswick New Democratic Party leadership election (planned date, cancelled due to having just one candidate)
October 28: 
2017 United Conservative Party leadership election (Alberta)
Whistler, British Columbia council by-election
Ɂakisq̓nuk First Nation by-election
October 30: 2017 Nunavut general election

November to December
November 4: Kaslo, British Columbia municipal by-election
November 5: 2017 Quebec municipal elections
November 18: 
View Royal, British Columbia council by-election
Queen Charlotte, British Columbia municipal by-election 
November 21: Mount Pearl North, Newfoundland and Labrador provincial by-election.
November 27: Charlottetown-Parkdale, Prince Edward Island provincial by-election.
December 2: Oliver, British Columbia municipal by-election
December 4: Nunavut municipal elections, 2017 (hamlets)
December 11: Federal by-elections in Bonavista—Burin—Trinity, Scarborough—Agincourt, Battlefords—Lloydminster and South Surrey—White Rock.
December 14: Provincial by-election in Calgary-Lougheed, Alberta.

References

External links
Elections BC: Local by-elections
Elections Quebec: By-elections in municipalities with 5,000 inhabitants or more

See also
Municipal elections in Canada
Elections in Canada

 
Political timelines of the 2010s by year